Boletus morrisii is a fungus of the genus Boletus native to North America. It was described in 1909 by mycologist Charles Horton Peck.

See also
List of Boletus species
List of North American boletes

References

External links
 

morrisii
Fungi described in 1909
Fungi of North America